The 1998 European Figure Skating Championships was a senior-level international competition held in Milan, Italy. Elite skaters from European ISU member nations competed in the disciplines of men's singles, ladies' singles, pair skating, and ice dancing.

Results

Men

Ladies

Pairs

Ice dancing

External links
 1998 European Figure Skating Championships 

European Figure Skating Championships, 1998
European Championships
1998
European Championships,1998
Sports competitions in Milan
January 1998 sports events in Europe
1998,Figure Skating,European Championships